Edgar Stuart, Duke of Cambridge (14 September 1667 – 8 June 1671) was the fourth son of James, Duke of York (later James II of England) and his first wife Anne Hyde. He was second in the line of succession to the English and Scottish thrones.

Life
Edgar was born on 14 September 1667 at St James's Palace and baptized there with the Duke of Albemarle, the Marquis of Worcester, and the Countess of Suffolk as sponsors. The name "Edgar" had ancient roots in both the English (Edgar the Peaceful) and Scottish (Edgar, King of Scotland) monarchies. On 7 October 1667 he was created Duke and Earl of Cambridge and Baron of Dauntsey. His elder brother Charles had died at the age of six months in 1661 before the patent for the title of Duke of Cambridge was passed and another brother, James was formally created Duke of Cambridge before his death in 1667 at the age of three. Edgar's titles became extinct until the birth of another son, also named Charles, in 1677.

His mother was ill for months following his birth and never fully recovered, though she gave birth twice more to daughters who died before their first birthdays; she died on 13 March 1671. Edgar died at Richmond Palace on 8 June 1671 leading to official mourning.
He was entombed in the royal vault in the Henry VII Chapel in Westminster Abbey on 12 June 1671, his coffin placed atop that of his mother.

Legacy
The town of Edgartown, Massachusetts, on Martha's Vineyard, settled in 1642, was named for him when incorporated in 1671, shortly before news of his death reached North America. Martha's Vineyard was then part of the proprietary colony of New York, gifted to Edgar's father the Duke of York in 1664 by Charles II.

Arms

Edgar bore a coat of arms, as a grandson of a British Sovereign, consisting those of the kingdom, differenced by a label argent of five points ermine.

Ancestry

References

External links
 

Cambridge, Edgar, Duke of
Cambridge, Edgar, Duke of
17th-century English nobility
Dukes of Cambridge
Earls of Cambridge
Cambridge, Edgar
Edgar
Edgar, Duke of Cambridge
Edgar, Duke of Cambridge
Burials at Westminster Abbey
Children of James II of England
Royalty and nobility who died as children
Sons of kings
Heirs apparent who never acceded